Mordellochroa humerosa is a species of beetle in the family Mordellidae. It is found in Europe and the Near East.

References

Mordellidae
Beetles of Asia
Beetles of Europe
Beetles described in 1847